Jan Wielemaker (1960, Koudekerke—) is a Dutch computer scientist and professor at the Vrije Universiteit Amsterdam. Wielemaker works at the Centrum Wiskunde & Informatica also. He is known for being the original author and one of the most extensive contributors to the SWI-Prolog implementation of the Prolog programming language, as well as the SWI-Prolog reference manual.

References 

1960 births
Dutch computer scientists
Living people
21st-century Dutch scientists